When the Devil's Loose is the second solo album by A.A. Bondy, released in 2009 (see 2009 in music).

Track listing

Personnel
A.A. Bondy – vocals and guitars
Ian Felice – guitar
Macey Taylor, Sr. – bass
Greg Farley – violin
Nick Kinsey – drums

Production
Producer: A.A. Bondy
Engineer: Bruce Watson
Mastering: Timothy Stollenwerk

Charts

References

A. A. Bondy albums
2009 albums